The Halifax Trojan Aquatic Club (HTAC) is a competitive swim team in Nova Scotia. HTAC is based out of Dalplex, the athletic facility for Dalhousie University, in Halifax, Nova Scotia. The Trojans also use Halifax's Centennial Pool as a secondary training facility.

HTAC is one of the oldest and largest swim teams in Atlantic Canada. The Trojans have over 300 members at various competitive levels, ranging from novice/introductory levels through to nationally ranked competitors.

The Trojans have won many Swim Nova Scotia Short Course and Long Course Provincial Championship titles as well as several Short and Long Course East Coast Championships titles over its history.

Famous swimmers
Nancy Garapick, double Bronze Medalist and World Record holder at the 1976 Summer Olympics
Susan Mason, National Team Member
Carwai Seto, represented Taiwan at the 1988 Summer Olympics
David Sharpe, represented Canada at the 2012 Summer Olympics

External links
Official team site
Swim Meet Results

Swim teams in Canada